Jhilahi railway station is a railway station on Lucknow–Gorakhpur line under the Lucknow NER railway division of North Eastern Railway zone. This is situated beside State Highway 9 at Mura Deeh, Jhilahi in Gonda district in the Indian state of Uttar Pradesh.

References

Railway stations in Gonda district
Lucknow NER railway division